Shorouk Air (ICAO Code: SHK; IATA Code: 7Q; Callsign: SHOROUK) was an Egyptian charter airline that operated between 1992 and 2003.

History
The airline was established in 1991 by Egyptair and Kuwait Airways as a regional charter carrier named Egyptian-Kuwait Air Services Company and renamed to Shorouk Air the following year. The airline ceased operations on 17 July 2003.

Fleet
The airline operated:
 8 Airbus A320
 2 Boeing 757-200
 2 Boeing 757-200PF

References

External links

Timetableimages.com, Timetable Image
Airfleets.net, Fleet information
Al-airliners.be, Alain's airliners, Photo gallery of airliners and airlines
CarSurvey.org, Flight Reviews
Airlineroutemaps.com, Route map
Shorouk Air aircraft

Defunct airlines of Egypt
Airlines established in 1992
Airlines disestablished in 2003
2003 disestablishments in Egypt
Egyptian companies established in 1992